Radical is the fourth and final studio album by Finnish rock band Smack. It was released in 1988.

Singles 
 "Mad Animal Shuffle"
 "I Want Somebody"

Track listing

Original album 
 "Set Me Free"
 "I Want Somebody"
 "Little Sister"
 "Mad About You"
 "You're All I Have"
 "Mad Animal Shuffle"
 "Street Hog Blues"
 "Wonderful Ride"
 "Strange Kinda Fever"
 "Russian Fields"

Personnel
 Claude (singer) – vocals
 Manchuria (guitarist) – guitar
 Rane (guitarist) – guitar
 Jimi Sero – bass
 Kinde (drummer) – drums

External links 
 Smack

1988 albums
Smack (Finnish band) albums